Riposto is a comune (municipality) in the Catania area of southern Italy.

History
Riposto is both historically and literally connected to Mascali, a once fiefdom of which it had been apart of as its commercial port in the 16th century and until it had finally gained local autonomy from in the 18th century. In the early 19th century, the town would be administratively merged with Giarre and become Giarre-Riposto by Fascist Italy. It was not until 1945 would the two towns be administratively divided once again, following the end of World War II.

Geography
The town is located on the Ionian Coast, and borders with the municipalities of Acireale, Giarre and Mascali. Its frazioni are Altarello, Archi, Carruba, Praiola, Quartirello and Torre Archirafi.

People
Franco Battiato (1945–2021), singer-songwriter
Federico Cafiero (1914–1980), mathematician

See also
Giarre-Riposto

References

External links

 Official website